Polynesia is a genus of moths in the family Geometridae. Species are found throughout India, Sri Lanka and Andaman Islands.

Description
Palpi slender, obliquely upturned, and reaching vertex of head. Antennae of male minutely ciliated. Hind tibia of male with a terminal pair of small spurs. Female with two pairs of spurs. Forewings with vein 3 from close to angle of cell. Vein 6 from or from above angle of cell. Veins 7,8,9,10 and 11 stalked from upper angle, or with a minute areole at their base. Hindwings with the outer margin produced to points at veins 7 and 4. The cell very short. Veins 3,4 and 6,7 on long stalks. Vein 5 from above middle of discocellulars. Vein 8 form close to end of cell, and then much curved.

Species
Polynesia curtitibia Prout, 1922
Polynesia sunandava (Walker, 1861)
Polynesia truncapex Swinhoe, 1892

References

External links

Asthenini